OECD Guidelines for the Testing of Chemicals (OECD TG) are a set of internationally accepted specifications for the testing of chemicals decided on by the Organisation for Economic Co-operation and Development (OECD).  They were first published in 1981. They are split into five sections:

 Section 1: Physical Chemical Properties
 Section 2: Effects on Biotic Systems
 Section 3: Environmental Fate and Behaviour
 Section 4: Health Effects
 Section 5: Other Test Guidelines

Guidelines are numbered with three digit numbers, the section number being the first number.  Sometimes guidelines are suffixed with a letter.

Guidelines are under constant review, with guidelines being periodically updated, new guidelines being adopted, and guidelines being withdrawn.  Previous guidelines are maintained on the website for reference purposes.  Animal welfare concerns are dealt with by ensuring that animal tests are only permitted where necessary.

The guidelines are available in both English and French.

List of guidelines

Section 1: Physical Chemical Properties

Section 2: Effects on Biotic Systems

Section 3: Environmental Fate and Behaviour

Section 4: Health Effects

Section 5: Other Test Guidelines

External links 
 OECD Guidelines for the Testing of Chemicals

OECD
Toxicology
Regulation of chemicals